Wells Township is the name of two places in the U.S. state of Pennsylvania:

Wells Township, Bradford County, Pennsylvania
Wells Township, Fulton County, Pennsylvania

Pennsylvania township disambiguation pages